Alex Caldwell (born 23 October 1954) is a Scottish former football player and manager. He played for Dundee, St Johnstone and Forfar Athletic in the Scottish Football League. Caldwell managed Elgin City from 2000 until 2002. Before joining Elgin, Caldwell had been assistant manager to Steve Paterson at Inverness Caledonian Thistle, and was involved in their shock Scottish Cup victory against Celtic in 2000.

References 

1954 births
Living people
Footballers from Edinburgh
Scottish footballers
Dundee F.C. players
St Johnstone F.C. players
Forfar Athletic F.C. players
Association football defenders
Scottish football managers
Elgin City F.C. managers
Inverness Caledonian Thistle F.C.
Scottish Football League managers